Enteractinococcus viverrae is a bacterium from the genus of Enteractinococcus which has been isolated from animal faeces from a Large Indian civet from the Yunnan Wild Animal Park in China.

References

Bacteria described in 2015
Micrococcaceae